Lorimor is a town in Union County, Iowa, United States. The population was 386 at the time of the 2020 census.

History
Lorimor was founded by J.S. Lorimor, who was given the honor of renaming the city, when the town grew after he gave land to the railroads as they traveled through town, in return for the railroad placing a water stop in the town. With the business from the railroads, and his  farm of bluegrass seed, the town was quite successful in its early years.

Geography

Demographics

2010 census
As of the census of 2010, there were 360 people, 160 households, and 104 families residing in the city. The racial makeup of the city was 98.1% White, 0.3% African American, 0.8% Native American, and 0.8% from two or more races. Hispanic or Latino of any race were 0.8% of the population.

There were 160 households, of which 28.8% had children under the age of 18 living with them, 43.8% were married couples living together, 13.8% had a female householder with no husband present, 7.5% had a male householder with no wife present, and 35.0% were non-families. 31.3% of all households were made up of individuals, and 13.1% had someone living alone who was 65 years of age or older. The average household size was 2.25 and the average family size was 2.72.

The median age in the city was 42.2 years. 22.5% of residents were under the age of 18; 7.5% were between the ages of 18 and 24; 24.1% were from 25 to 44; 29.6% were from 45 to 64; and 16.4% were 65 years of age or older. The gender makeup of the city was 45.8% male and 54.2% female.

2000 census
As of the census of 2000, there were 427 people, 176 households, and 114 families residing in the city. The racial makeup of the city was 98.83% White, 0.23% Native American, 0.47% Asian, and 0.47% from two or more races. Hispanic or Latino of any race were 0.47% of the population.

There were 176 households, out of which 31.3% had children under the age of 18 living with them, 51.7% were married couples living together, 10.8% had a female householder with no husband present, and 34.7% were non-families. 27.8% of all households were made up of individuals, and 13.1% had someone living alone who was 65 years of age or older. The average household size was 2.43 and the average family size was 2.99.

In the city, the population was spread out, with 28.3% under the age of 18, 8.0% from 18 to 24, 27.4% from 25 to 44, 21.8% from 45 to 64, and 14.5% who were 65 years of age or older. The median age was 35 years. For every 100 females, there were 92.3 males. For every 100 females age 18 and over, there were 90.1 males.

The median income for a household in the city was $28,636, and the median income for a family was $30,500. Males had a median income of $26,071 versus $20,179 for females. The per capita income for the city was $12,713. About 13.2% of families and 18.9% of the population were below the poverty line, including 31.9% of those under age 18 and 11.8% of those age 65 or over.

Gallery

References

Cities in Iowa
Cities in Union County, Iowa